Veer-Isha Nu Seemant is a 2022 Gujarati-language  film, directed by Neeraj Joshi starring Malhar Thakar and Puja Joshi. It was produced by Dhruvin Dakshesh Shah and distributed by Rupam Entertainment. It was released on 9 September 2022.

Plot 
A couple decides not to have kids after their marriage but their families and society have expectations that make it difficult for the newlyweds. Will they stick to their plan?

Cast
 Malhar Thakar
 Puja Joshi
 Anurag Prappana 
 Chhaya Vora
 Feroz Bhagat
 Sonali Lele Desai 
 Krunal Pandit
 Deepali Bhuta
 Rahul Rawal
 Vaibhav Biniwale
 Hem Sevak

Soundtrack

The soundtrack of the album is composed by Kedar - Bhargav with lyrics written by Bhargav Purohit. The soundtrack album consists of Two tracks. Three songs are released by Navkar Music.

Marketing and release 
The official trailer was released on YouTube on 29 August 2022. The film was released on 9 September 2022.

Reception 
Rachana Joshi of Mid-day reviewed 2.5 out of 5. She praised the subject, social message and comic timings but criticised the story.

References

External links
 

2022 films
2020s Gujarati-language films
Films shot in Gujarat